Hillary Dourtha Butler (born January 5, 1971, in San Francisco, California) is a retired professional American football linebacker who played in the National Football League and the NFL Europe League. In his four-year pro career he played for the Seattle Seahawks of the NFL, Frankfurt Galaxy of NFL Europe and a member of the SB XXXIII Denver Broncos. Hillary was on the field during the Terrell Davis breakout year of 2,000 + yard season. Butler played college football at the University of Washington. He now is the coach at Lakes High School in Washington

References

1971 births
Living people
Players of American football from San Francisco
American football linebackers
Washington Huskies football players
Frankfurt Galaxy players
Seattle Seahawks players